Ferry Mursyidan Baldan (16 June 1961 – 2 December 2022) was an Indonesian politician. A member of Golkar and later Nasdem, he served in the People's Representative Council from 1997 to 2009 and served as Minister of Agrarian Affairs and Spatial Planning from 2014 to 2016.

Baldan was found dead in his vehicle in Jakarta on 2 December 2022, at the age of 61.

References

1961 births
2022 deaths
Golkar politicians
Nasdem Party politicians
Working Cabinet (Joko Widodo)
Padjadjaran University alumni
Politicians from Jakarta
Members of the People's Representative Council, 1997
Members of the People's Representative Council, 1999
Members of the People's Representative Council, 2004